Joe Morolong Local Municipality (formerly Moshaweng Local Municipality) is an administrative area in the John Taolo Gaetsewe District of the Northern Cape in South Africa.

Moshaweng is a Setswana name for "place of sand".

Main places
The 2001 census divided the municipality into the following main places:

Politics 

The municipal council consists of twenty-nine members elected by mixed-member proportional representation. Fifteen councillors are elected by first-past-the-post voting in fifteen wards, while the remaining fourteen are chosen from party lists so that the total number of party representatives is proportional to the number of votes received. In the election of 1 November 2021 the African National Congress (ANC) won a majority of eighteen seats on the council.
The following table shows the results of the election.

References

External links
 Official website

Local municipalities of the John Taolo Gaetsewe District Municipality